is the thirtieth single of J-pop idol group Morning Musume. It was released on June 21, 2006. The Single V was released on June 28, 2006.

Overview
There are regular and limited edition versions of this single. The regular version comes with a photocard in a poker card design. The limited edition comes with a DVD containing comments from the members and two performances from their Rainbow 7 concert tour, Aozora ga Itsumademo Tsuzuku You na Mirai de Are! and Sexy Boy (Soyokaze ni Yorisotte). It also came with 10 interchangeable covers, one featuring each member.

This is the last single to feature 5th generation graduated members Asami Konno and Makoto Ogawa, after which Sayumi Michishige and Risa Niigaki respectively took their solos in live performances of the song.

Track listings

CD 
 
 
 "Ambitious! Yashinteki de Ii Jan" (Instrumental)

Limited Edition DVD 
Performances from Morning Musume Concert Tour 2006 Haru ~Rainbow Seven~

Single V DVD 
 "Ambitious! Yashinteki de Ii Jan"
 "Ambitious! Yashinteki de Ii Jan (Dance Shot Ver.)"

Members at time of single 
 4th generation: Hitomi Yoshizawa
 5th generation: Ai Takahashi, Asami Konno , Makoto Ogawa , Risa Niigaki
 6th generation: Miki Fujimoto, Eri Kamei, Sayumi Michishige, Reina Tanaka
 7th generation: Koharu Kusumi

External links 
 Ambitious! Yashinteki de Ii Jan entry on the Up-Front Works official website

Morning Musume songs
Zetima Records singles
2006 singles
Song recordings produced by Tsunku
Songs written by Tsunku
2006 songs
Electronic dance music songs